Science, Technology & Society is a peer-reviewed journal. It provides a forum for discussion on how the advances in science and technology influence society and vice versa. It is published three times a year by SAGE Publications.

Science Technology & Society has been honoured with the Charles et Monique Moraze Award by Fondation Maison Des Sciences De l'homme.

This journal is a member of the Committee on Publication Ethics (COPE).

Abstracting and indexing 
Science, Technology and Society is abstracted and indexed in:
 Australian Business Deans Council
 CCC
 DeepDyve
 Dutch-KB
 EBSCO
 ICI
 J-Gate
 National Academy of Agricultural Sciences (NAAS)
 ProQuest: International Bibliography of the Social Sciences (IBSS)
 Pro-Quest-RSP
 SafetyLit
 SCOPUS
 Social Sciences Citation Index (Web of Science)
According to the Journal Citation Reports, the journal has a 2017 impact factor of 0.707, ranking it 192nd out of 209 journals in the category "Management".

References

External links
 

SAGE Publishing academic journals
Triannual journals
Science and technology studies journals
Publications established in 1996
English-language journals
Business and management journals